The women's 50 metre butterfly competition of the swimming events at the 2012 European Aquatics Championships took place May 21 and 22. The heats and semifinals took place on May 21, the final on May 22.

Records
Prior to the competition, the existing world, European and championship records were as follows.

Results

Heats
47 swimmers participated in 6 heats.

Semifinals
The eight fastest swimmers advanced to the final.

Semifinal 1

Semifinal 2

Final
The final was held at 17:18.

References

Women's 50 m butterfly
Women's 50 metre butterfly
2012 in women's swimming